Vali (nominative singular of the stem वालिन् (Valin)), also known as Bali, was a king of Kishkindha in the Hindu epic Ramayana. He was the husband of Tara, the biological son of Indra, the elder brother of Sugriva, and father of Angada. He was killed by Rama the avatar of Vishnu. Vali was invincible during theTreta Yuga. Vali defeated some great warriors because of his blessed ability to obtain half the strength of his opponent. Rama killed Vali by shooting him in the chest. However, during his first attempt, Rama could not distinguish between Vali and Sugriva due to their resemblance. Thus, during the next attempt, Sugriva wore a garland of red flowers and went to battle with Vali. This time, Rama could recognise Vali and shot an arrow that killed him.

Early life
Vali was the husband of Tara. As one myth goes, fourteen types of gem or treasure were produced from the churning of the ocean during the time of Kurma avatar. One gem is that various apsaras (divine nymphs) were produced and Tara was an apsara produced from the churning of the ocean. Vali who was with his father Indra, helping them in the churning of ocean, took Tara and married her.

Vali was very courageous. This can be understood from the fact that, when Tara tried to stop him and begged him not to go to fight Sugriva, by saying that it is Rama who is helping Sugriva and has come to Sugriva's rescue; Vali replied to Tara that even if he is fighting against God he cannot ignore a challenge for a fight and remain quiet. He adds that even if the caller for the fight had been his own son Angada, he would still go to fight.

The Quarrel 
According to the Ramayana, a raging demon known as Mayavi came to the doors of Kishkindha and challenged Vali to a fight. Vali accepted the challenge. When he came forth, the demon got terrified and ran into a cave. Vali entered the cave and told Sugriva to wait outside. When Vali did not return and he heard demonic voices from inside the cave and blood oozing from inside the cave, Sugriva mistakenly concluded that Vali was dead. He closed the cave with a large boulder and presumed kingship over Kishkindha. However, inside the cave, Vali killed the demon and returned home. Upon seeing Sugriva act as a king, Vali thought his brother had betrayed him. Sugriva tried to explain his actions, but Vali didn't listen. Sugriva ran off to Rishyamuka mountain, the only place Vali would be unable to enter because of the curse of the sage Matanga.

War with Ravana 

Though not in the original Ramayana, but in the Uttarkand Ravana is said to have fought with Vali.

Ravana learns about Vali and his strengths through Narada. Hearing Narada praising Vali, Ravana became extremely arrogant and went to Kishkinda. There Vali was in meditation. Ravana challenged Vali to come and fight. First Sugriva fought with Ravana and was defeated. Ravana then reached Vali and challenged him. Vali and Ravana then fought a fierce battle. Vali tied him with his tail (carried him on his shoulders in some other versions) then arrested Ravana. Vali started carrying Ravana under his armpit for years. Ravana could not bear the insult and delivered a severe blow with a lot of anger on Vali's face. Vali suffered huge pain and had to release him. Ravana was impressed with Vali and asked him for friendship.

Rama meets Sugriva 

Wandering in the forest with his brother Lakshmana in search of his wife Sita – kidnapped by the rakshasa king Ravana, Rama meets rakshasa Kabandha and kills him, freeing him from a curse. The freed Kabandha advises Rama to seek the help of Sugriva to find Sita.

Continuing on his journey, Rama meets Hanuman and is impressed by his intelligence and skills as an orator. This also boosts Rama's confidence in Sugriva. Sugriva tells him the story of how Vali became his enemy. In Sugriva's version, he is entirely innocent and Rama believes him.

Sugriva is very scared of Vali and he is full of doubts that Rama could kill him. He tells him many remarkable stories of Vali's power. As proof, he shows Rama a hole in a saal tree which Vali had made in one shot. When it is Rama's turn, he penetrates seven saal trees in a row with one arrow. After going through the trees, the arrow even makes a strike on a huge rock and splits it into pieces. Sugriva is happy and says, "O Rama, you are great."

Rama asks Sugriva to challenge Vali and bring him outside Kishkindha. As Rama explains later, for 14 years he cannot enter a city. Moreover, Rama does not want any unnecessary bloodbath of Vali's army with whom he wants to maintain friendly relations. Despite this, killing Vali would not be impossible for Rama as Sugriva and Vali were identical twins. Just a few days before, Rama had killed Khara and Dushana and their army of 14,000 rakshasas.

Sugriva formed an alliance with Rama. Rama had been travelling the length of India in search of his kidnapped wife, Sita. Sugriva asked Rama's help in return for his help in defeating Ravana and rescuing Sita. The two hatched a plan to topple Vali from the throne.

Sugriva challenged Vali to a fight. When Vali sallied forth to meet the challenge, Rama emerged from the forest to shoot and kill him with an arrow.

The dying Vali told Rama, "If you are searching for your wife you should have come to me for help and friendship. Whoever took Sita, I would have brought them to your feet, to your mercy."

Vali asked the following questions:

 He made my wife a widow and stole my kingdom. What was my crime?
 Even if I committed a crime (with my brother), what is your right to kill me? I would have helped you in getting Sita;
 
your father King Dasharatha helped my father King Indra to fight against rakshasas.

Rama makes the following replies to Vali:

 The younger brother should be treated like a son. Even if he made a mistake you should forgive him, especially when he promised to respect you for your whole life.
 About his authority, Rama said that he is the king of Ayodhya and ruler of these parts of the jungle as well. 

You have abducted your own brother's wife while he was alive. I cannot take help from such an evil person.

After Vali's Death
After death of Vali, Sugriva recaptures his kingdom and regains his wife Ruma. Angada, son of Vali and Tara, is made Yuvaraja, or the crown prince.

Rama's slaying of Vali had a special significance. In the beginning, Vali argued with Rama about his killing. Rama explained to him about the various purusharthas and how everything was pre-ordained according to the kalachakra and granted him moksha. Vali was then convinced and also asked his son Angada to stand by his uncle Sugriva and assist in the divine work of Rama.

Vali's son, Angada, joined Rama's army and was given important responsibilities in Rama's war against Ravana.

Rebirth as Jara
Because Rama had killed Vali, Rama blessed Vali that he would die of his arrow which he would fire by camouflage when he took the incarnation of Krishna. Later on he was born as Jara the hunter in Dvapara Yuga to kill Krishna, the next avatar of Vishnu, in same way as said by Rama. He was searching for hunt in forest and he saw a deer but it actually was Krishna's bare foot. He shot an arrow with an iron piece of mace attached to it.

References

External links
Mahabharata, Book III: Vana Parva, Section 278: online text for the section of the Mahabharata describing Rama's alliance with Sugriva and the killing of Vali.
Ramayana, Book IV, Canto 16: online text for the section of the Ramayana of Valmiki describing Bali's death at the hands of Rama.
Photographs of a bas relief at the temple of Banteay Srei in Cambodia depicting the combat between Vali and Sugriva.
Valmiki Ramayana Kishkindha Kanda Prose Sagara 11

Vanara in the Ramayana
Characters in the Ramayana